Farizi (also Romanized as Farīzī and Ferīzī; also known as Farezi and Ferezī) is a village in Golmakan Rural District, Golbajar District, Chenaran County, Razavi Khorasan Province, Iran. At the 2006 census, its population was 799, in 253 families.

References 

Populated places in Chenaran County